The Bollinger Mill State Historic Site is a state-owned property preserving a mill and covered bridge that pre-date the American Civil War in Burfordville, Cape Girardeau County, Missouri. The park was established in 1967 and offers mill tours and picnicking. It is managed by the Missouri Department of Natural Resources.  It includes the Burfordville Covered Bridge, which is listed on the National Register of Historic Places.

History

Mill history
In 1797, George Frederick Bollinger received a land grant from the Spanish Government and moved with several other families from North Carolina to what is now Burfordville, Missouri. In 1800, Bollinger began building a log dam and mill on the Whitewater River. In 1825, Bollinger rebuilt the mill and dam using limestone. After Bollinger's death in 1842, his daughter Sarah Daugherty and her sons continued to operate the mill until the Civil War, when the mill was burned by the Union army in order to prevent the supply of flour and meal to the Confederate army. Following the war, the mill site was sold to Solomon R. Burford. The current four-story brick mill was completed by Burford in 1867 and is built upon the limestone foundation of the 1825 building. Burford owned the mill until 1897, when the Cape County Milling Company took over operations and continued operating the mill until 1953 when the mill was sold to the Vandivort family, relatives of George Bollinger. The mill was donated to the Cape Girardeau County Historical Society in 1961 and to the State of Missouri in 1967. It was added to the National Register of Historic Places in 1971.

Bridge history

Construction began on a bridge over the Whitewater River in 1858, but was delayed several years by the Civil War. In 1868, around the time that Bollinger completed his mill, the town of Burfordville was created and construction was completed on the bridge, making the Burfordville bridge the oldest of the four surviving covered bridges in Missouri. It is a Howe truss made of locally cut yellow poplar. As part of the toll road, the bridge originally included a toll booth on the east end, which was used until 1906.

Around 1900, the bridge had fallen into disrepair, with some missing siding and a partially collapsed roof. The county spent $390 to repair the bridge in 1908, and it was once again restored in 1950 when a metal roof was added. In 1967, the same year the mill was donated to the state, the Missouri State Park system began maintaining the four remaining covered bridges in the state. The bridge was added to the National Register of Historic Places in 1970, one year before it was restored by the park service, at which time the metal roof was replaced with wooden shingles.

In 1986, the Whitewater River reached record levels, 17 inches over the deck of the bridge, which damaged the bridge and resulted in its closure to both vehicular and pedestrian traffic. The bridge remained closed until 1998 when repairs to lower trusses, support timbers, and vertical iron rods made it possible to reopen the bridge to pedestrian traffic.

Activities and amenities
The mill is open year-round for guided tours. Milling demonstrations using the original milling equipment are performed when water levels in the river allow. In addition to milling demonstrations, the first floor of the mill contains exhibits that describe how the milling process changed over the years. The mill hosts special events during the year including folk music concerts and a display of restored farming equipment. The bridge is open year-round to foot traffic.

See also
 List of Missouri covered bridges

References

External links

Bollinger Mill State Historic Site Missouri Department of Natural Resources
Bollinger Mill State Historic Site Map Missouri Department of Natural Resources

Missouri State Historic Sites
Watermills in the United States
Protected areas established in 1967
Mill museums in Missouri
Museums in Cape Girardeau County, Missouri
Grinding mills in Missouri
Protected areas of Cape Girardeau County, Missouri
Former toll bridges in Missouri
Covered bridges on the National Register of Historic Places in Missouri
National Register of Historic Places in Cape Girardeau County, Missouri
Grinding mills on the National Register of Historic Places in Missouri
Road bridges on the National Register of Historic Places in Missouri
Wooden bridges in Missouri
1967 establishments in Missouri
1825 establishments in Missouri
Industrial buildings completed in 1825